Greenbriar may refer to:

 Smilax, a plant genus commonly called greenbriar

Places
 Greenwood/Greenbriar, Calgary, Alberta, Canada
 Greenbriar, Florida, U.S.
 Greenbriar, Atlanta, Georgia, U.S.
 Greenbriar Mall
Greenbriar Lake, Texas, U.S.

See also
 Brier (disambiguation)
 Greenbrier (disambiguation)
 The Greenbriar Boys, bluegrass band